Snow-speeder, Snow Speeder, Snowspeeder, or, variant, may refer to:

 snow-speeder, another name for a snowmobile
 sno-speeder, a type of downhill sled/toboggan with a steerable front ski and pair of rear runner
 Snowspeeder, fictional flying vehicle, see list of Star Wars air, aquatic, and ground vehicles
 スノースピーダー (lit. Snow Speeder), Japanese videogame, released to North America as Big Mountain 2000
 Snowspeeder, a fictional ground vehicle from the 2008 film One-Eyed Monster

See also
 Speeder (disambiguation)